Agriculture in the Comoros is an industry in the country of the Comoros.

Production
Comoros produced in 2018:

 106 thousand tons of coconut;
 66 thousand tons of cassava;
 46 thousand tons of banana;
 31 thousand tons of rice;
 10 thousand tons of taro;
 7.8 thousand tons of sweet potato;
 7 thousand tons of maize;

In addition to smaller productions of other agricultural products.

See also
Economy of the Comoros

References